Raj Kumar Goel Institute of Technology (RKGIT), is a private college in Ghaziabad, India. It is affiliated to Dr. A.P.J. Abdul Kalam Technical University.

History 
Raj Kumar Goel Institute of Technology was established in 2000 by late Sri Raj Kumar Goel. The institute is recognized by both governing bodies, All India Council for Technical Education (AICTE)  and Council of India (PCI) and it is affiliated to Dr. A.P.J. Abdul Kalam Technical University.

In April 2020 during COVID-19 pandemic in India the institute was temporarily converted in quarantine center by order of the Government of Uttar Pradesh.

Campus 
The institute is spread over 27 acres. Its facilities include canteens, hostels, library, sports, transportation, ATMs, computer lab, classrooms, auditorium and conference hall, as well as language lab and medical facilities.

Events
Each year, college students participate in national and state-level sports, games, Hackathon debates and other competitions.

Sports Council
Sports Council is a student council that organizes events for both boys and girls. This event is generally kept intra-college. Some 30 sports are supported. The cricket tournament and football events are the top attraction for most students.

Academics
The degree programs (aka courses) offered at RKGIT fall into the following categories.

B. Tech.
Bachelor of Technology in Mechanical Engineering, Information Technology, Civil Engineering, Electrical & Electronics Engineering, Computer Science and Engineering, Electronics and Communication Engineering. The duration of the full-time B.Tech program is four years.

M. Tech.
Master of Technology in Electronics and Communication Engineering. The duration of the Post Graduate Program in Engineering is two years.

MBA
It was started in 2003. The duration of a full-time program MBA is two years.

Pharmacy
This includes M. Pharma (Pharmaceutics), M. Pharma (Pharmacology). The program launched 2004. The Pharmacy course is accredited by National Board of Accreditation.

Admissions 
Admission is entirely based on the merit system via State Entrance Examination - of Dr. APJ Abdul Kalam Technical University, Lucknow (commonly known as UPSEE) and online counselling. Unfilled seats are filled as per the norms of Dr. APJ Abdul Kalam Technical University, State Government and All India Council for Technical Education (AICTE).

Amenities
RKGI has eight hostels, six for boys and two for girls. Most of the students live in on-campus hostels.

Students enjoy indoor sports such as table tennis and snooker, and outdoor sports including cricket, volleyball, and kabaddi.

The college has the following amenities.

Bank and ATM facilities inside the college campus
A spacious auditorium
Gym for both boys and girls
One cafeteria is separately available for boys and girls. Only vegetarian food is served in the mess.
The institute is tied-up with some of the well-known hospitals and institutions of Ghaziabad.
Healthcare: Availability of the emergency facilities such as first aid and ambulance in the hostels
Safety and security in the entire campus is monitored and controlled by the security personnel
Modernly designed 60 laboratories with workshops and computer labs
High tech classrooms for modern teaching and learning
Surrounding of approximately 27 acres with a large sports ground, staff rooms, seminar halls, classrooms, lecture halls
Alumni associations

Societies 
RKGIT has the following societies:
 Birds
 Black Illusion
 Bytes Technical Magazine
 Electrical and Electronics Engineering Department
 Electrazz Club
 Electronics & Communication Engineering Department
 Krystaspark
 IEEE Student branch
 Association of Electronics and Communication Engineers
 Computer Science & Engineering Department
 Computer Society of India (CSI) Student branch
 Computer Science Student Society (CSSS)
 Mechanical Engineering Department
 Society of Automotive Engineers BAJA
 Satyarth Dramatic Society
 YANTRIKOM
 Indian Society of New Era Engineers (ISNEE)
 Unwaan Theater Dramatic Society
 PUSHPAK: THE FLYING CLUB
 Taxila 
 SPIC EII
 STHAPATYA

Recognition
Best Engineering College in Ghaziabad awarded by Big Brand Research Pvt. Ltd. (2011)
"Certification of Appreciation 2009" awarded by UPTU.
National Employability Award by Aspiring Minds in 2013-14

Research 
Securing 4 G Networks With Y-Communication Using AKA Protocol

Gallery

References 

Universities and colleges in Uttar Pradesh
Private engineering colleges in Uttar Pradesh
Pharmacy colleges in Uttar Pradesh
Engineering colleges in Ghaziabad, Uttar Pradesh
Educational institutions established in 2000
Dr. A.P.J. Abdul Kalam Technical University
2000 establishments in Uttar Pradesh